The Dubrava Prison is a correctional facility located near Istok, Kosovo, the largest prison in the country.

Events

1999 bombings and executions

On 19 and 21 May NATO bombed the prison, killing at least 23 KLA members. A prison riot followed, during which Serbian forces killed more than 100 Albanians.

2003 riot
Five inmates were killed and 16 injured during a riot that broke out on 4 September 2003 following protests on the living conditions in the prison. UNMIK tried to peacefully end the protest but inmates set fire to their mattresses.

In 2019 a study on the quality of life in the prison was published.

References

Sources

Prisons in Kosovo
Men's prisons